Rösrath is a town in the Rheinisch-Bergischer Kreis (district) in North Rhine-Westphalia, Germany. The earliest known documents mentioning the settlement Rösrath can be found in documents dated to 1356. There have been findings of Paleolithic and Mesolithic tools in the town area Forsbach. The community was elevated to the town status in 2001.

Geography
Rösrath is located in the immediate vicinity of Cologne. The municipal area of Rösrath is bordering on the south-eastern city limits of Cologne. Therefore, from Cologne's point of view Rösrath is called a Gateway to the Berg region (Bergisches Land).
The municipal area partly extends over the nature reserves of the Wahner Heide and Königsforst.

Local government

Council, elections in May 2014:
 CDU 17 seats
 SPD 12 seats
 Alliance 90/The greens 6 seats
 FDP 4 seats
 Alternative für Deutschland / AfD 2 seats
 The Left 2 seats
 BfR (Bürger für Rösrath-Citizens for Rösrath) 1 seat
 Dieter von Niessen 1 seat
 Kacem Bitich (independent), 1 seat

Mayors

Coat of Arms
The coat of arms of Rösrath consists of two areas:
 The upper area shows the red lion of Berg with blue crown, tongue and claws. The lion appears in most of the coats of arms in the district of the Rheinisch-Bergischer Kreis.
 The lower area shows a hunting horn with a green background. It symbolizes the Königsforst, in former times a popular hunting district of the earls of Berg.

Culture

Rösrath is known for the Rose Monday Parade, organized every year.

Landmarks

The gateway of Eulenbroich Castle is virtually the landmark of Rösrath. This "gateway to the Berg region" (Bergisches Land) is used as logo on the letterheads and internet pages of the town council.

Twin towns – sister cities

Rösrath is twinned with:
 Veurne, Belgium (1974)
 Chavenay, France (1998)
 Crespières, France (1998)
 Feucherolles, France (1998)
 Saint-Nom-la-Bretèche, France (1998)

Notable people
Chris Howland (1928–2013), entertainer, actor and author, lived in Rosrath
Wolfgang Bochow (1944–2017), badminton player
Rainer Brüninghaus (born 1949), jazz pianist and composer, has been living in Rösrath since 1976
Anke Engelke (born 1965), actor and comedian, graduated from the Freiherr-vom-Stein-Schule in Rösrath in 1984

References

External links

Official website 
Chronicle of mayors of Rösrath since 1945

Towns in North Rhine-Westphalia
Rheinisch-Bergischer Kreis
Districts of the Rhine Province